Vandana Chiplunkar is a  former badminton player. She was the bronze medalist in badminton at the 1982 Asian Games in the Women's Team event.

References

External links
 

Living people
Year of birth missing (living people)
Indian female badminton players
Asian Games medalists in badminton
Badminton players at the 1982 Asian Games
Asian Games bronze medalists for India
Medalists at the 1982 Asian Games